Aschach an der Donau is a municipality in the district Eferding in the Austrian state of Upper Austria.

Geography 
Aschach lies in the Danube Valley, on the edge of the Eferding Basin in the Hausruckviertel. About 2 percent of the area is forested.

Subdivisions are: Aschach an der Donau (center), Ruprechting, and Sommerberg.

Coat of arms 
Silver and red, covered by two natural colored, twisted grapevines with a blue grape to the left, a green grape to the right and a green leaf in each half.

The colors of the banner are red, white and green.
The motif indicates due to climatic advantages in the early Middle Ages operated winery, which was mentioned in the Stiftbrief for Kremsmünster in the year 777 and was maintained in the area around Aschach in some vineyards until after 1870.
White-red are the colors of the banner of arms of the Counts of Schauberg, who until 1559 held government and a major toll in Aschach.

History 
First mentioned in the year 777 at the founding of the monastery Kremsmünster, Aschach was originally part of the eastern part of the Duchy of Bavaria and belonged to the Duchy of Austria up to the 12th Century.

1490 Aschach was attributed to the Principality of Österreich ob der Enns, and received the market rights and Coat of arms in 1512 by Emperor Maximilian. During the Napoleonic wars the town was occupied several times. Since 1918, the town belongs to the state of Upper Austria. After the annexation of Austria to the German Reich March 13, 1938 the town belonged to Gau Oberdonau. After 1945 followed the restoration of Upper Austria.

Celts and Romans in Aschach 
The Celtic name Joviacum appeared first on the Itinerarium Antoninianum at the time when the Roman Emperor Marcus Aurelius Antoninus, nicknamed Caracalla, reigned from 211-217.

1838 during excavations in Schlögen extensive wall remains of a Roman fort were found. Therefore, by the middle of this century it was assumed that Schlögen was Joviacum as referred to in the Directory of Roman legions. After excavations in the years 1957-1959 by Dr. Lothar Eckhart proved: Schlögen cannot be Joviacum. Eckhart associates the Militum Liburnariorum, a sort of Marines of the Italian Legion, with Aschach, the mounted military units Ad Mauros with Eferding. Other than strategic reasons speak for that Aschach is Joviacum the St. Laurentius-patronage of the chapel at the cemetery, the evidence of a Roman square floor plan and the finding of street pavement stones and cart ruts (Limes road?) In the Abelstraße.

Since Aschach is Joviacum, this brings us into the closest connection with the most amazing sources of departing Antiquity with the "Life of St. Serverin" of the abbot Eugippius. St. Severin appeared in Noricum, a time when the Roman rule came to an end. As a monk and miracle worker, he resisted the Germanic princes, who were sitting with their tribes on both sides of the Danube. In the deserted Roman settlements, he persuaded the defenseless poor Roman people to a Christian lifestyle. When the circumstances had become untenable, he predicted them the imminent defeat of their place and ordered the evacuation of the area. So also for Aschach (Joviacum). We read in the Vita Sancti Severini Eugippii:

"... the servant of God sent the church singer Moderatus to the inhabitants of a city called Joviacum which was more than 20 miles away from Batavis, who should ask there an immediate escape from the vulnerable city. Also here the well-meant advice was not heard so that the saint sent off a courier again, who should at least prompt the church leader Maximianus of Joviacum to leave the village. When also this messenger was not believed, he left the city quickly. Still in the same night the Heruli invaded Joviacum, destroyed the settlement and led most of the inhabitants into slavery. The priest they hung on the gallows."

The details of the Vita is deemed reliable, earlier doubts are resolved by more recent research. Thus, under stipulation of the assumption of the accuracy that Aschach is Joviacum it is testified that the Late Antiquity martyr is MAXIMIANUS of Aschach.

Population

Politics

Municipal Council 
The following parties are represented in the council:
 SPÖ (5 seats)
 ÖVP (11 seats)
 FPÖ (6 seats)
 The Greens (3 seats)

Mayor 
Incumbent Mayor is Friedrich Knierzinger (ÖVP).

 Mayors since 1849

Sister City 
 The Official Sister City is Obernzell in Bavaria, Germany

Landmarks

Aschach has a historic center with town houses dating from the Middle Ages, with beautiful facades and courtyards from the Gothic, Baroque and Renaissance.
Parish Churc 'Danube Cross': around 1490 follows the Late-Gothic succeeding building of an originally in 1371 first mentioned church on records. The high altar is crowned by the healing powers of the revered Danube cross. It was brought ashore in 1693 by two sailors in a flood. The sickly restorer of the cross was healed during his work. 1784, Aschach was separated by a government decree of Emperor Joseph II from the mother-church Hartkirchen and elevated to an independent parish. 1976, the church was renovated and expanded, designed by Clemens Holzmeister.
Old Town Hall
Schloss Aschach': The manor house is the former seat of the Counts of Harrach. The main wing of the manor house from the 16th Century has arcades in the courtyard on all three floors. The east wing was built in 1709 by Johann Lucas von Hildebrandt, as well as the altar in the chapel. The castle is privately owned.
Kraftwerk Aschach: The hydro power plant was built 1959-1964 and was once Europe's largest hydro power plant.
Schopper and Fishery museum. The museum presents the history of the Market Aschach in connection with the shipbuilding - and shipping tradition on the Upper Danube. The Schopper museum presents the historic craft of shipbuilding and also the social and cultural environment of these craftsmen's guilds. In addition, the last original Zehner Trauner is displayed. The Fisheries Museum shows the development of commercial and recreational fishery in Upper Austria with special reference to the upper Danube.

Transport 
In addition to the Danube, the main traffic route for thousands of years, in 1886 Aschach was connected by the Aschacher Bahn (Aschach - Eferding - Wels) to the modern transportation system.

During the power plant construction the railway was extended through Aschach to the power plant (then dismantled).

In 1962 the ferry ("Flying Bridge") was replaced by the bridge farther down the river and thus the region Mühlviertel and the central region connected to one another.

Bus lines operate scheduled bus service between neighboring cities among which are Wels, Linz, and Passau in Bavaria.

Education 
Kindergarten
Elementary School
Middle School

References

Bibliography
 Ernst Neweklowsky: Aschach und die Donauschiffahrt. In: Oberösterreichische Heimatblätter 13 (195993), S. 207-242. (Digitalisat)

Cities and towns in Eferding District